Vaddaradhane by Shivakotiacharya is the earliest extant prose work in Kannada.  It is a didactic work consisting of nineteen stories and is based on Harisena's Brhatkathakosa. The work is also known for mentioning the precursor to modern idli called iddalige prepared using black gram batter.

Description 
It gives a detailed description of the life of Bhadrabahu of Shravanabelagola. The work is dated to the 9th century but some scholars advance a pre-sixth century date for the work. Based on internal evidence, it is suggested that Shivakotiacharya may have been a native of Kogali, in the Bellary district of modern Karnataka.

The list of 19 stories are
 Story of Sukumara swamy
 Story of SukaushaLa swamy
 Gajakumara
 Sanathkumara prince 
 Annii kavrutha
 Bhadrabhau bhatarara
 Lalithaghate
 Dharmaghosha
 Siridhinnia  bhatarara
 Vrushabha sena bhatarara
 Karthika rishi
 Abhayaghosha rishi
 Vidyuthchoraa rishi
 Gurudatta bhatarara
 Chilata putra
 Dandaka rishi
 Mahendradattacharyaand 
 Chanakya rishi
 Vrushabhasena rishi

Notes

References
 Shivakotiacharya Virachita Vaddaradhaane, D. L. Narasimhachar, Sharada Mandira Krishnarajapuram, Mysore

Kannada literature
Jain texts